A Master of Civic Design (MCD) is a postgraduate academic master degree in Town and Regional Planning awarded by the University of Liverpool, England. The degree level is equivalent to a Master of Arts or Master of Science postgraduate degree in alternative disciplines.

The degree (MCD) is unique in that it is the only taught postgraduate degree with that label. The University of Liverpool's Department of Civic Design is the world's first planning school, and as such the MCD label uniquely identifies graduates from the department.

The degree is a taught programme of study that enables students from a wide range of undergraduate degree backgrounds to embark on a career of professional practice in town planning and related fields. The degree is typically studied as a two-years full-time programme with full accreditation from the Royal Town Planning Institute, giving licentiate membership of the Royal Town Planning Institute.

References

Master's degrees